Here You Are: The Best of Billy Ocean is a two-disc compilation album by British R&B singer and songwriter Billy Ocean, released in 2016. The first disc includes cover versions of 1950s and 1960s pop and rock songs, and the second disc includes most of Ocean's hit recordings.

Reception 

Ian Sime from York's The Press says Ocean's cover of "A Simple Game" is richly infused with Northern Soul angst, calling it "the perfect hit single". However, his interpretations of "A Change Is Gonna Come", "No Woman No Cry" and "Having a Party" have a "distinct air of Cabaret Classic, and the least said about his rendition of "Cry Me a River" the better."

Super Deluxe Edition's Justyn Barnes says that: "Here You Are: The Best of Billy Ocean has a rather cute cover photo of the young Leslie Charles who would grow up to become big Billy O, Grammy-award-winning artist, and the audio content of this double CD released by Sony Music CMG is designed to reflect his – as they say on X Factor – 'journey'."

Background 
To promote the album, Billy Ocean toured in 2016.

Track listing

Disc one

Disc two

Charts

Release history

References 

Billy Ocean compilation albums
2016 compilation albums
Legacy Recordings compilation albums
Sony Records compilation albums
Albums produced by Robert John "Mutt" Lange